The Ferraris map or map of the Austrian Netherlands is a historical map created between 1770 and 1778 by the count Joseph de Ferraris in response to a request by Prince Charles Alexander of Lorraine. It is the first systematic, large scale mapping in Belgium and Western Europe.

There are three original versions of the map. The Royal Library of Belgium, the Austrian National Library and National Library of the Netherlands each have one.

History
The topographic survey was performed on a territory corresponding to today's Belgium and Luxembourg as well as some territories now belonging to Germany and the Netherlands.

The map was published at the original scale of 1/11.520 and includes 275 sheets.

Importance

Napoleon Bonaparte consulted the maps and subsequently used his topographical knowledge in his military campaigns. 

The Ferraris maps reflect the detailed state of the Southern Netherlands just before the start of the Industrial Revolution and the end of the Ancien Régime, when the landscape was still similar to that of the Middle Ages. Looking at the maps today, it is obvious how much the areas have changed over time as people began to have a bigger impact on the environment. Environmental organisations like to use the maps to point out the original state of an area.  

The maps can also help identify archaeological finds. This works both ways: archaeologists regularly use the maps to search for remains of buildings. Engineers can consult the maps to check for soil stability, since the maps feature mining pits that no longer exist but can still pose a danger.

External links 

 
 

Maps of the Netherlands